Protostadienol synthase (PdsA, (S)-2,3-epoxysqualene mutase [cyclizing, (17Z)-protosta-17(20),24-dien-3beta-ol-forming]) is an enzyme with systematic name (3S)-2,3-epoxy-2,3-dihydrosqualene mutase (cyclizing, (17Z)-protosta-17(20),24-dien-3beta-ol-forming). This enzyme catalyses the following chemical reaction

 (3S)-2,3-epoxy-2,3-dihydrosqualene  (17Z)-protosta-17(20),24-dien-3beta-ol

(17Z)-Protosta-17(20),24-dien-3beta-ol is a precursor of the steroidal antibiotic helvolic acid.

References

External links 
 

EC 5.4.99